Turia is a commune in Covasna County, Transylvania, Romania composed of two villages:
Alungeni / Futásfalva
Turia / Torja

History 

It formed part of the Székely Land region of the historical Transylvania province. From 1876 until 1918, the village belonged to the Háromszék County of the Kingdom of Hungary. After the Treaty of Trianon of 1920, it became part of Romania.

Demographics

The commune has an absolute Székely Hungarian majority. According to the 2011 Census it has a population of 4,053 of which 98.84% or 4,006 are Hungarian.

Point of interests

References

Communes in Covasna County
Localities in Transylvania